Jane Asher (born 5 April 1946) is an English actress and author. She achieved early fame as a child actress and has worked extensively in film and TV throughout her career.

Asher has appeared in TV shows and films such as Deep End (1970), The Masque of the Red Death (1964), Alfie (1966), The Mistress, Crossroads, Death at a Funeral (2007), and The Old Guys. She also appeared in two episodes of the 1950s TV series The Buccaneers alongside Robert Shaw. She was well known as the girlfriend of Paul McCartney from 1963 to 1968.

Early life
Asher was born in London, the middle of three children born to Richard and Margaret Asher, née Eliot. Her father was a consultant in blood and mental diseases at the Central Middlesex Hospital, as well as being a broadcaster and the author of notable medical articles. Asher's mother was a professor at the Guildhall School of Music and Drama. Asher was educated at North Bridge House School and Miss Lambert's PNEU School for Girls at Paddington, then at Queen's College in Harley Street, London. Asher's elder brother is record producer and manager Peter Asher, who started his career as Peter of Peter and Gordon.

Acting career
Asher was a child actress who appeared in the 1952 film Mandy and the 1955 science fiction film The Quatermass Xperiment. She also played the title role in dramatised versions of Alice in Wonderland and Through the Looking-Glass in 1958 for Argo Records. In 1961 she co-starred in The Greengage Summer, which was released in the United States as Loss of Innocence. She also appeared in the 1962 film and Disney TV programme, The Prince and the Pauper. British TV appearances included three episodes (1956–1958) of the ITV series The Adventures of Robin Hood and as a panelist on the BBC's Juke Box Jury.

Asher appeared in Roger Corman's The Masque of the Red Death (1964) with Vincent Price, in Alfie opposite Michael Caine in 1966, and in Jerzy Skolimowski's Deep End (1970) with John Moulder Brown.

Having played Alice herself as an 11-year-old child in the audio recordings of Alice in Wonderland and Through the Looking Glass in 1958, Asher played the real Alice's (Alice Liddell) mother, Lorina Liddell, in the 1985 Dennis Potter film Dreamchild alongside Coral Browne (Alice Hargreaves), Ian Holm (Lewis Carroll/Charles Dodgson), Peter Gallagher, and Amelia Shankley (young Alice).

On television, she guest-starred in episodes of the British television comedy series The Goodies, The Stone Tape, Wicked Women, and Rumpole of the Bailey, as Celia Ryder in the 1981 Granada Television adaptation of Brideshead Revisited,  A Voyage Round My Father opposite Laurence Olivier, The Mistress (1985–87), and as Faith Ashley in Wish Me Luck (three seasons from 1987 to 1989).

In 1994, she portrayed the Doctor Who companion Susan Foreman in a BBC Radio 4 comedy drama Whatever Happened to Susan Foreman? Another notable radio broadcast was in The Further Adventures of Sherlock Holmes in 2002, in the episode "The Peculiar Persecution of Mr John Vincent Harden".

In 2003, she appeared in the revived ITV soap, Crossroads where she played the hotel's owner, Angel Sampson. After the soap was axed, Asher apologised to Crossroads fans for the way the 2003 series went.

In 2004, she starred in Festen at the Arts Theatre. In 2005, she starred in The World's Biggest Diamond, by Gregory Motton, at the Royal Court Theatre. In 2006, Asher starred in the Richard Fell adaptation of the 1960s science fiction series A for Andromeda, which aired on the British digital television station BBC Four. In 2007, she portrayed the widow Sandra in the Frank Oz film Death at a Funeral. The same year Asher appeared in the BBC medical drama, Holby City as Lady Byrne. In October 2007, she played Andrea Yates in The Sarah Jane Adventures, in the episode "Whatever Happened to Sarah Jane?" Asher co-starred in the 2008 ITV drama series The Palace, filmed in Lithuania; she played Queen Charlotte, mother of King Richard IV.

In August 2008, Asher appeared in the reality TV talent show-themed television series, Maestro, on BBC Two with other showbusiness personalities. From 2009 to 2010, she played Sally in the BBC One comedy series The Old Guys. In 2011, she played Margaret Harker in Waterloo Road.

In October 2009, she appeared as Delia in Peter Hall's revival of Alan Ayckbourn's Bedroom Farce at the Rose Theatre, Kingston and in her first pantomime, Snow White and the Seven Dwarfs at Richmond Theatre in December 2009, receiving enthusiastic reviews for both. In 2011, she returned to the Rose, Kingston as Lady Bracknell in The Importance of Being Earnest.

In 2012, she appeared in Charley's Aunt at the Menier Chocolate Factory. In the summer of 2013, she played Lady Catherine de Bourgh in Pride and Prejudice at the Open Air Theatre, Regent's Park. In 2014, she starred in the stage adaptation of Penelope Lively's Moon Tiger at the Theatre Royal Bath and on tour. In 2016, Asher took on the role of Miss Havisham in Michael Eaton's adaptation of Great Expectations. She took on the role of Madame Baurel in the 2017 London stage production of An American in Paris (musical).

Other work
Asher has written three novels: The Longing, The Question, and Losing It, and published more than a dozen lifestyle, costuming, and cake decorating books. Asher owns a company that makes party cakes and sugar crafts for special occasions.

She is a shareholder in Private Eye, president of Arthritis Care, and a patron of Scoliosis Association (UK).

She is also president of the National Autistic Society. She was a speaker at the 2006 launch of the National Autistic Society's "Make School Make Sense" campaign and is president of Parkinson's UK. In March 2010, Asher became vice president to Autistica, a UK charity raising funds for autism research. Asher is also a patron of TRACKS Autism, an early years nursery setting for children on the autistic spectrum and The Daisy Garland, a national registered charity supporting children with drug resistant epilepsy.

Personal life
On 18 April 1963, the 17-year-old Asher interviewed the Beatles at the Royal Albert Hall in London, and began a five-year relationship with Paul McCartney. In December 1963, McCartney took up residence at Asher's family Wimpole Street town house and stayed there until the couple moved into McCartney's own home located in St John's Wood in 1966. McCartney wrote several Beatles songs inspired by her, including "And I Love Her", "You Won't See Me", "I'm Looking Through You", "What You’re Doing", "For No One", "We Can Work It Out" and veiled references in "Martha My Dear". McCartney and Asher announced on Christmas Day 1967 that they were engaged to be married, and in February and March 1968, Asher accompanied the Beatles and their respective partners to Rishikesh to attend an advanced Transcendental Meditation training session with the Maharishi Mahesh Yogi. In mid 1968, Asher returned to London from an acting assignment in Bristol earlier than expected and allegedly discovered McCartney in bed with Francie Schwartz. A fan who frequently loitered around Paul's Cavendish Avenue home claims to have witnessed the incident, saying: "Paul brought this American girl home... [and a little while later]... another car turned into Cavendish Avenue—it was Jane. She'd come back... earlier than she was supposed to. Jane went into the house. A bit later on, she came storming out again and drove away." Shortly after, Margaret Asher drove to Cavendish Avenue to collect her daughter's things.

On 20 July 1968, Asher announced publicly to the BBC that her engagement to McCartney had been called off, an announcement that shocked many people, including McCartney himself, who was soon to start dating Linda Eastman, whom he would marry in 1969. At the time of Asher's announcement, McCartney was at his father's home with Schwartz by his side. Though Schwartz confirmed that Asher did see them in bed together, she claims that she was not the sole reason for the breakup, and that the couple were on the verge of separating prior to Asher's walking in. Authors Hunter Davies and Barry Miles state that the relationship always had several problems, one of them being that McCartney wanted Asher to give up her acting career after they married, which Asher refused to do. Another problem in the relationship was McCartney's drug use and close relationship with John Lennon. After returning to London from a five-month acting tour of the United States in May 1967, Asher found McCartney to be completely different, confiding in Davies that McCartney had "changed so much. He was on LSD, which I hadn't shared. I was jealous of all the spiritual experiences he'd had with John. There were fifteen people dropping in all day long. The house had changed and was full of stuff I didn't know about."

Asher attended the 1970 London premiere of the Beatles' last movie, Let It Be, along with John Lennon's former wife Cynthia, though the former Beatles did not attend.

In 1971, Asher met the illustrator Gerald Scarfe. They married in 1981 and have three children. Asher dislikes discussing her relationship with McCartney. She stated in 2004: "I've been happily married for 30-something years. It's insulting."

Filmography

Film

Television

Awards and nominations

References

Other sources

Further reading
 
 Dye, David. Child and Youth Actors: Filmography of Their Entire Careers, 1914-1985. Jefferson, NC: McFarland & Co., 1988, p. 7.

External links
 
 
 

English film actresses
English humanists
English soap opera actresses
English stage actresses
English television actresses
1946 births
Living people
People educated at Queen's College, London
Muses
English child actresses
20th-century English actresses
21st-century English actresses
20th-century English novelists
English women novelists
English non-fiction writers
20th-century English women writers
Audiobook narrators
People from Willesden